Ever since Pole Position in 1982, Formula One (F1) has always played a part of the racing genre in video games. Early Formula One games were typically arcade racing games, before Formula One Grand Prix (1991) popularized Formula One racing simulations on home computers.

History

Early roots and arcade games (1970s–1990s)
The roots of Formula One games can be traced back to the 1970s, with arcade racing games such as Speed Race and Gran Trak 10 which depicted F1-like cars going on a race track.

F-1 (1976) by Namco has been cited as the first true Formula One arcade game. However, it was an electro-mechanical game, rather than an arcade video game.

The first successful Formula One video game in arcade history was Pole Position (1982), by Namco. In Pole Position, the player has to complete a lap in a certain amount of time in order to qualify for a race at the Fuji racetrack. After qualifying, the player had to face other cars in a championship race. The game was very successful and it spawned an official sequel, Pole Position II, and an unofficial one, Final Lap. After the success of Pole Position, many similar games appeared in arcades (and later ported to home computers) such as TX-1 (1983).

During the late 1980s, successful arcade games included Super Sprint, which uses the top view instead of the rear view of most games, and its sequel Championship Sprint.

From the second part of the 1980s more games were being created. Most of these games featured racetracks, cars and driver names similar to the real ones, but all modified slightly, since they did not have official licenses from FIA. Examples of this are Super Monaco GP (1989) and its sequel Ayrton Senna's Super Monaco GP II (1992), which had a license to display only Ayrton Senna's name), or Nigel Mansell's World Championship, but many other less known games had similar features.

Formula One racing games made the transition to 3D computer graphics with Namco's arcade game Winning Run (1988). Later arcade manufacturers began developing games in this style, like Sega with its Virtua Racing (1992), and later Namco again with Ace Driver (1994), which featured futuristic, F1-like cars.

Formula One began officially licensing video games in the early 1990s, starting with Video System's arcade game F-1 Grand Prix (1991). It was ported to the SNES by Nintendo, and spawned two sequels and a Super Mario Kart-style spinoff.

Dawn of F1 home computer games (1980s–1990s)
The first true Formula One racing simulators on home computers were Chequered Flag (1983) and Geoff Crammond's Formula One Grand Prix (F1GP) in 1991. Chequered Flag featured fuel depletion and car damage, and a set of several real circuits. Previously, most racing games representing Formula One, such as Accolade's Grand Prix Circuit and Electronic Arts' Ferrari Formula One, had been arcade-style games, but F1GP paid more attention to the physics of the cars, in addition to innovative graphics and accurate rendering of the actual racing tracks. The game, released in 1992, was based on the  season.

The F1 official license was also held by Ubisoft and later transferred to Electronic Arts, which published seasonal simulations and also F1 Challenge '99-'02.

A notable place on PC simulation games is held by Papyrus' Grand Prix Legends, which depicted the 1967 Formula One season instead of the then-current season, like all other contemporaries. It recreates in a very accurate way the physics of the car and the feel of driving a real 1967 Formula One racer. The game still has a vast popularity among video gamers, with many mods and original circuits being produced.

Console gaming and Sony exclusivity (1990s–2000s)
The first half of the 1990s saw a growing in popularity of Formula One games, and many software houses began acquiring licences and display most real names and cars, for example Formula One by Domark, which featured most real tracks, drivers and teams.

The first 3D games to feature a full license were F1 Challenge (1995) for the Sega Saturn, and Formula 1 (1996) developed by Bizarre Creations for the PlayStation, the first game of the successful Formula One series. Despite the game being a mostly arcade game rather than a simulation, it was very well received; later the series moved towards a more realistic race approach. Other Formula One games released in the late 1990s include EA Sports F1 Series (which runs from the 1999–2002 F1 season with all drivers from each season).

Sony had held an exclusive license to make Formula One games from 2003 until 2006, releasing sequels to Formula 1 on its PlayStation systems roughly at an annual pace throughout that time to form its Formula One series, as well as licensing the release of Infogrames' 2003 PS2-exclusive game Grand Prix Challenge, developed by Melbourne House.  Challenge was well received by critics, particularly its high quality graphics for its time, despite being unknown to most F1 gaming fans.

Codemasters takes control (2009–2021)
Sony concluded their Formula One series with the releases of Formula One 06 on the PS2 and PSP and Formula One Championship Edition on the PlayStation 3. In 2008, Codemasters obtained the F1 license, beginning their own annual Formula One video game series. The first game of the series, F1 2009, was released on the Wii, PlayStation Portable and iOS, with the Wii version supporting the Wii Wheel for motion-controlled steering. Subsequent annual sequels were released on non-Nintendo consoles and personal computers, with F1 2011 also being available on eighth-generation handhelds and F1 2016 also available as a paid mobile title on iOS and Android.  Besides the Wii U port of the F1 Race Stars spin-off, subtitled Powered-Up Edition, no other Codemasters F1 game has been available on a Nintendo console.

While Formula One games in general are strict reproductions of the sport regardless of gameplay style, Codemasters' F1 Race Stars was the first to bring Mario Kart-style gameplay to the setting, while their official license from FIA (which the company has held since 2009) allowed for the teams (complete with their respective sponsors) and drivers from that year's season to be given a cartoonish makeover.

Return to Electronic Arts (2021–present)
In late 2020, Electronic Arts acquired Codemasters after outbidding Take-Two Interactive's offer to buy the company. As a result, all subsequent installments of Codemasters' ongoing F1 video game series, starting with the 2021 season's game, will be published by Electronic Arts, making this the first F1 game to be published by the company in nearly two decades, after F1 Career Challenge and F1 Challenge '99-'02.

While Electronic Arts publishes the main F1 racing games, Frontier Developments developed and published the management simulator F1 Manager 2022, which holds the official license for the  season.

Modding
Owing to the popularity of the sport, the technical and legal limitations of earlier titles (such as the omission of alcohol and tobacco branding) and lack of representation of particular seasons, the act of modding video games to feature specific seasons of Formula 1 has been popular since the 1990s, particularly following the releases of Grand Prix 2 in 1996 and Grand Prix Legends in 1998. Later on, ISIMotor-derived titles such as F1 Challenge '99-'02 and rFactor would continue the trend, with cars reaching ever higher levels of accuracy, down to race-specific configurations in regards to sponsorship and aero packages. rFactor's development studio, Image Space Incorporated, would later work with the BMW Sauber F1 team to feature the team's cars as standalone downloadable content. More recently, one of the more popular titles for modded Formula 1 seasons is the title Assetto Corsa, released in 2014.

In addition to simulation-based titles and even outside the racing genre, Formula 1 cars have been made available as mods in many different video games over the years, either through models ported from pre-existing titles (such as EA Sports' F1 Championship Season 2000), or scratchbuilt. Due to their prevalence and real-world performance, these cars are popular choices to mod into games such as the Need for Speed and Grand Theft Auto franchises. The 2002 freeware title GeneRally also features a large range of Formula 1 seasons available for download, each car rendered in just 40 polygons.

List

A list of Formula One video games that lists only those uses the F1 name, whether it is licensed by the Formula One Group or just F1 in name; is licensed by racing drivers and teams involved within the series otherwise featuring sprites that resemble a Formula One car in a way to get around licensing, featuring deliberately misspelt driver and team names; is named after a Grand Prix race that appear in the F1 calendar or those that features races that appear in the F1 calendar.  Thus far, F1 games are playable on the following, numerous platforms: Arcade, SG-1000, Intellivision, ColecoVision, Commodore 64, ZX Spectrum, Atari 7800, Nintendo Entertainment System, Game Boy, Commodore 16, Commodore Plus/4, Amstrad CPC, MSX, Amiga, Atari ST, Atari Jaguar, PC DOS, Sega Genesis, Sega Game Gear, TurboGrafx-16, Super Nintendo Entertainment System, Sega Master System, Sega CD, Sega Saturn, PlayStation, Microsoft Windows, Nintendo 64, Dreamcast, Game Boy Color, PlayStation 2, Xbox, GameCube, PlayStation Portable, PlayStation 3, Wii, Xbox 360, iOS, PlayStation Vita, Nintendo 3DS, Mac OS X, Wii U, PlayStation 4, PlayStation 5, Xbox One, Xbox Series X/S, macOS, Android, tvOS and Linux.

References

External links